The Adventures of Batman & Robin is a series of video game adaptations released between 1994 and 1995 featuring the DC Comics characters Batman and Robin based on Batman: The Animated Series (which had been retitled The Adventures of Batman and Robin for its second season). The games were released for numerous platforms, with the Genesis, Game Gear, and Sega CD versions published by Sega while the Super NES version was published by Konami (who also produced an earlier Game Boy video game based on the show).

Super NES version

The Super NES version is developed and published by Konami. Each level consists of an episode that is loosely based on those from the animated series, taking Batman to an amusement park and other places where supercriminals do their work. Despite the title, Batman is the only playable character, as the game was developed before the show's title change, but Robin still appears in the game as a non-playable ally during certain conversation sequences.

The soundtrack was written by Konami Kukeiha Club members Kazuhiko Uehara, Harumi Ueko, Jun Funahashi, Masanari Iwata, Masahiko Kimura, Kayo Fujitani, and Masahiro Ikariko.

Gameplay
For the most part, it is an action-adventure platformer in which the player controls Batman, and follows him to the end of each stage, where a villain is set to appear. Some of the more common features in the game is the possibility to equip with different gadgets, such as bombs and x-ray lenses. The gadgets are in some cases essential to complete some stages. The player can return to the Batcave in order to re-equip the gadgets and restart a stage with all the lives accumulated up to that point (in case the player had lost lives).

The game features passwords, which leave the player in the last played stage. The passwords also take count of the number of lives remaining and the continues used. Passwords cannot be used in hard difficulty, which means that the game must be completed from the beginning. Completion of the hard mode rewards the player with a special ending.

Genesis version
The Genesis version, developed by Clockwork Tortoise and published by Sega, is a run 'n' gun where both Batman and Robin must stop Mr. Freeze, who plans to freeze Gotham City. In order to keep the duo busy, he also frees the Joker, Two-Face and the Mad Hatter, each one with their own agenda. The Joker celebrates his birthday wreaking havoc in Gotham and stealing diamonds, Two-Face tries to take over the city from above, and Mad Hatter is creating a robot army in his surreal lair.

The game can be played by two players simultaneously; one player with Batman, and the other with Robin. Both characters are identical in terms of playability, and both use batarangs, bolas, or shuriken in long-range attacks, while using melee attacks at short range. There are four levels consisting of several stages, mostly of a straight left-to-right traverse to the end where the boss awaits. In some levels the game switches to a side-scrolling shooter, in which the players must control the Batwings.

The Genesis version of the game was released on August 2, 1995. The game features a dark electronica-styled soundtrack by Jesper Kyd.

Sega CD version
The Sega CD version, also developed by Clockwork Tortoise and published by Sega, consists of chase screens with the Batmobile and Batplane. Between levels, the story advances through animated cutscenes that were created specifically for the game. The animated cutscenes were produced by Warner Bros. Animation (with animation by Tokyo Movie Shinsha, which also animated some of the episodes of the original cartoon). Kevin Conroy (Batman), Loren Lester (Robin), Robert Hastings (Commissioner James Gordon), Robert Costanzo (Harvey Bullock), Diane Pershing (Poison Ivy), John Glover (the Riddler), Arleen Sorkin (Harley Quinn), Mark Hamill (the Joker), John Vernon (Rupert Thorne) and Ron Perlman (Clayface) all reprised their roles from the animated series. The animated segments (about seventeen minutes in total) in the video game for the Sega CD are sometimes referred to as "The Lost Episode" of the series.

Game Gear version
The Game Gear version was developed by Novotrade and published by Sega. The Joker has assembled a gang of old Batman foes and kidnapped Robin, and the Batman has to go save him. There are four different levels, each with 2 or 3 stages, where Batman runs around beating up thugs and jumping between platforms before taking on a boss. Each stage ends with a boss encounter - some generic machine or thug in the early stages, and a classic Batman villain at the final stage of the level. The four levels takes Batman through a theater where he takes on the Mad Hatter, a frozen office building where he takes on Mr. Freeze, a graveyard where he takes on the Scarecrow, and finally an amusement park where he takes on Harley and the Joker.

Batman typically fights with projectile attacks - he has an unlimited supply of batarangs, but can pick up other weapons with limited ammunition in small item boxes along the way. They are all more powerful than the batarangs. Once Batman gets close to an enemy, he will switch to melee attacks, which deal more damage than the projectiles. Batman can make several types of jumps, both upwards and sideways. Pressing the jump button twice does a double jump. Batman starts out with 9 extra lives, and instantly respawns where he died after losing one, with a full health bar, all ammunition intact, and all inflicted damage and defeated enemies accounted for. There are also multiple extra lives and life bar refill items spread around on the stages. The game has infinite continues and a password system, allowing the player to start over from any previously reached stage. The only punishment for having to continue is that the player's score is reset to zero, encouraging full playthroughs without continuing.

Reception

Reviewing the Super NES version, GamePros Bacon praised the game's often brain-teasing challenges, strong graphics and sound effects, and "eerie atmosphere". Though he criticized the fact that Robin appears only in cutscenes, the "vapid" dialogue, and the poor graphics and controls of the Batmobile stages, he concluded "The tame fighting and intricate challenges in The Adventures of Batman and Robin should please thoughtful action/adventure fans. But its beautiful graphics and supernatural sounds will impress anyone." Nintendo Power also criticised the game for not giving Robin a more active role (although the game was actually under development before the series was retitled between seasons). Next Generation reviewed the SNES version of the game, rating it three stars out of five, and stated that "Unfortunately, the game's diverse play is flawed by a slow-moving character that can make it difficult to pull off quick jumps or attacks. In addition, the wildly varying difficulty levels often leave the game way too easy or frustratingly hard."

A reviewer for Next Generation gave the Genesis version one out of five stars, citing its generic side-scrolling platform gameplay and failure to recreate the look of the TV show. Scary Larry of GamePro called the Genesis version "a standard side-scrolling platform game with great backgrounds from the show but mediocre action", citing tedious and overly difficult level design, unresponsive controls, poor character visuals, and repetitive music. The four reviewers of Electronic Gaming Monthly  gave it a 6.875 out of 10, remarking that the graphics and sounds are excellent, but the action is simplistic, repetitive, and overly difficult due to the large numbers of enemies attacking all at once.

While noting that it has a more diverse selection of weapons than the Genesis version, Scary Larry said that the Game Gear version is likewise "predictable side-scrolling action." He also criticized the music as "annoying and repetitive." The four reviewers of Electronic Gaming Monthly gave it a 6.375 out of 10. They said it has good cartoon-style graphics and level design, but that the screen blurs when moving and enemies frequently fire bullets from off-screen which the player has no time to react to, both of which make the game unfairly difficult. Al Manuel went so far as to say that it was "probably the hardest game I have ever played."

The four reviewers of Electronic Gaming Monthly commented that while the FMV cutscenes in the Sega CD version are entertaining, the gameplay is repetitive and frustrating due to trees and other objects blocking the player's view of the road. One of them summarized the game as "a CD full of cartoon episodes with a so-so driving game included to break up the animated sequences." Tommy Glide of GamePro particularly criticized the lack of variety in the gameplay, commenting that "This barely average driving game should be called The Adventures of the Batmobile". A reviewer for Next Generation likewise regarded the rudimentary and repetitive gameplay to be the game's main flaw. Calling it "a journey into sheer tedium, boring yet frustrating at the same time", he scored it two out of five stars. IGN ranked the game #94 on its "Top 100 SNES Games of All Time". In 2018, Complex listed the game 45th in their "The Best Super Nintendo Games of All Time."  They praised the game that it did the cartoon justice and called the game superb.

See also
 List of Batman video games

References

External links
 
 
 

1994 video games
1995 video games
Video games based on Batman: The Animated Series
Video games based on adaptations
Run and gun games
Super Nintendo Entertainment System games
Sega Genesis games
Sega Genesis-only games
Game Gear games
Sega CD games
Sega CD-only games
Konami games
Top-down video games
Video games scored by Burke Trieschmann
Video games scored by Jesper Kyd
Video games developed in Hungary
Video games developed in the United Kingdom
Superhero video games
Video games set in the United States
Video games developed in Japan